Chocolate agar (CHOC) or chocolate blood agar (CBA), is a nonselective, enriched growth medium used for isolation of pathogenic bacteria. It is a variant of the blood agar plate, containing red blood cells that have been lysed by slowly heating to 80°C. Chocolate agar is used for growing fastidious respiratory bacteria, such as Haemophilus influenzae and Neisseria meningitidis. In addition, some of these bacteria, most notably H. influenzae, need growth factors such as nicotinamide adenine dinucleotide (factor V or NAD) and hemin (factor X), which are inside red blood cells; thus, a prerequisite to growth for these bacteria is the presence of red blood cell lysates. The heat also inactivates enzymes which could otherwise degrade NAD. The agar is named for its color and contains no chocolate products.

Variants 
Chocolate agar with the addition of bacitracin becomes selective for the genus Haemophilus. Another variant of chocolate agar called Thayer–Martin agar contains an assortment of antibiotics which select for Neisseria species.

References

Microbiological media